Quimperlé Communauté is the communauté d'agglomération, an intercommunal structure, centred on the town of Quimperlé. It is located in the Finistère department, in the Brittany region, northwestern France. Created in 1993, its seat is in Quimperlé. Its area is 607.0 km2. Its population was 55,993 in 2019, of which 12,220 in Quimperlé proper.

Composition
The communauté d'agglomération consists of the following 16 communes:

Arzano
Bannalec
Baye
Clohars-Carnoët
Guilligomarc'h
Locunolé
Mellac
Moëlan-sur-Mer
Querrien
Quimperlé
Rédené
Riec-sur-Bélon
Saint-Thurien
Scaër
Tréméven
Le Trévoux

References

Landerneau
Landerneau